Safiyya al-Baghdadiyya was a Medieval Arabic poet writing during the 12th Century CE. This late period of the Abbasids has been called a Golden Age which 'created a liberal, but elite, society keen to enjoy Allah's earthly gifts'. 

The diwans (collected poems) of female poets were not as well recorded, and little is known about al-Baghdadiyya's life. Her poem 'I am the wonder' is collected in Abdulla al-Udhari's Classical Poems by Arab Women (1999). Al-Udhari notes in the book that 'Nothing is known about the poet'. The poem demonstrates al-Baghdadiyya's liberal outlook and remarkable self-confidence:I am the wonder of the world, the ravisher of hearts and minds.Once you’ve seen my stunning looks, you’re a fallen man.

References

Categories

Women poets from the Abbasid Caliphate
Arabic-language women poets
Arabic-language poets
12th-century women from the Abbasid Caliphate
12th-century women writers
12th-century Arabic poets